Beat Mändli (born 1 October 1969) is a Swiss equestrian and Olympic medalist. He won a silver medal in show jumping at the 2000 Summer Olympics in Sydney.

References

1969 births
Living people
Swiss male equestrians
Olympic equestrians of Switzerland
Olympic silver medalists for Switzerland
Equestrians at the 1996 Summer Olympics
Equestrians at the 2000 Summer Olympics
Olympic medalists in equestrian
Medalists at the 2000 Summer Olympics
Equestrians at the 2020 Summer Olympics